Walter Carr may refer to:

 Walter Carr (actor) (1925–1998), British actor
 Walter Carr (physician) (1862–1942), British physician and surgeon
 Walter J. Carr (1896–1970), American pilot and aircraft promoter

See also
 Wally Carr (1954–2019), Aboriginal Australian boxer